Catedral is a parish located in the Libertador Bolivarian Municipality  northeast of the city of Caracas, Venezuela.

References

Parishes of Capital District (Venezuela)